Kannot (eng. Seedlings) is an educational institution and youth village in central Israel. Located near Gedera, it falls under the jurisdiction of Be'er Tuvia Regional Council.

Etymology
It is named after an occasional word, just mentioned once: in the Bible in Psalm 80:16: (God, watch over) "the seedling your right hand has planted".

History
The village was founded in 1952 by the Workers' Council of the Histadrut,  on the lands of the depopulated Palestinian village of Bashshit.

References

External links
Official website 

Youth villages in Israel
Populated places in Southern District (Israel)
Populated places established in 1952
1952 establishments in Israel